Donald Thomas Brash (born 24 September 1940) is a former New Zealand politician who was Leader of the Opposition and leader of the New Zealand National Party from October 2003 to November 2006, and briefly the leader of ACT New Zealand from April to November 2011.

In 1988, Brash became Governor of the Reserve Bank of New Zealand, a position which he held for the next fourteen years. In April 2002, before the general election on 27 July, Brash resigned from his position to stand as a list MP for the National Party. He was elected, despite significant losses for National in that election. He challenged Bill English for leadership of the National Party, being elected leader on 28 October 2003. On 27 January 2004, Brash delivered his controversial Orewa Speech, expressing opposition to perceived Māori separatism, through New Zealand's equitable measures designed to benefit them.

At the 17 September 2005 general election, National under Brash's leadership made major gains and achieved what was at the time the party's best result since the institution of the mixed-member proportional electoral system in 1993 – recovering from its worst ever result in 2002. Final results placed National two seats behind the incumbent New Zealand Labour Party, with National unable to secure a majority from the minor parties to form a governing coalition.

On 27 November 2006, Brash resigned as National Party leader. He subsequently retired from Parliament in February 2007. In October 2008, he was appointed as an adjunct professor of Banking in the Business School at the Auckland University of Technology, and an adjunct professor in the School of Economics and Finance at La Trobe University in Melbourne, Australia.

On 28 April 2011, Brash was elected the party leader of ACT (a libertarian party) after his bid for its leadership was accepted and he was confirmed by the ACT caucus and board. In 2016, he founded the right-wing lobby group Hobson's Pledge, to seek to nullify the partnership between Māori and the Crown, and further oppose equitable measures for Māori.

Childhood, education and marriage 
Don Brash was born to Alan Brash, a Presbyterian minister and son of prominent lay leader Thomas Brash, and Eljean Brash (née Hill), in Whanganui on 24 September 1940.

His family moved to Christchurch when he was six. He attended Cashmere Primary School and Christchurch Boys' High School before going to the University of Canterbury where he graduated in economics, history and political science. He continued his studies in economics, receiving his master's degree in 1961 for a thesis arguing that foreign investment damaged a country's economic development. The following year he began working towards a PhD (again in economics, at the Australian National University), which reached the opposite conclusion.
In 1964 Brash married his first wife, Erica, with whom he had two children. In the 1980s he and his Singaporean secretary, Je Lan Lee, entered into a relationship. Both were married at the time. He separated from his first wife in 1985 and four months after they were divorced he married Lee. In 2007, his second marriage also broke up, following an affair with Diane Foreman, then Deputy Chair of the Business Round Table. Brash and Lee had one child together.

Early career 

Brash went to Washington, D.C. in the United States in 1966 to work as an economist for the World Bank. However, he returned to New Zealand in 1971 to become general manager of Broadbank Corporation, a merchant bank.

Brash's first entry into politics came in 1980 when the National Party selected him to stand as its candidate in the by-election in the East Coast Bays electorate. Brash's attempt at the seat, however, failed – some believe that this resulted from the decision by Robert Muldoon, National Party Prime Minister, to raise tolls on the Auckland Harbour Bridge, an important route for East Coast Bays residents. The seat went to Gary Knapp of the Social Credit Party. Brash again failed to win the seat at the 1981 general election.

In 1982 Brash became managing director at the New Zealand Kiwifruit Authority, which oversaw the export of kiwifruit (he  grows kiwifruit as a hobby). In 1986 he became general manager of Trust Bank, a newly established banking group.

Reserve Bank governor 

In 1988 Brash became governor of the Reserve Bank of New Zealand, a position which he held for the next 14 years. Brash consistently met Government-set targets to keep inflation within 3% during his time as governor, and during his tenure interest-rates dropped from double-digit to single-digit percentages.

Aside from monetary policy, Brash presided over significant changes in banking supervision, with the New Zealand approach emphasising public disclosure by banks regarding the nature of their assets and liabilities. Under his governorship, the Reserve Bank of New Zealand established a new model of the relationship between government and central bank – not totally independent, like the Bundesbank in Germany, and not dominated by government, as was typical of most central banks at the time, but one where government and central bank agreed in public about the inflation rate to be delivered by the central bank, where the central bank had full independence to run monetary policy to deliver that, and where the central bank's governor was held accountable for the inflation outcome. It was the Reserve Bank Act 1989 which established this contractual relationship (based on price stability targets) between the Bank and the Government, rather than giving direct control to Ministers of Finance.

Changes took place in the currency used in New Zealand during Brash's tenure, notably the introduction of polymer banknotes, and the replacement of Queen Elizabeth's face on most of the banknotes. , many banknotes in circulation still carry the signature of Brash from his term as governor.

There is a range of opinion on Brash's performance as Reserve Bank governor. The New Zealand Association of Economists describe Brash's success in establishing an independent central bank with an inflation target and in reducing inflation as a highlight of his career. Documentary maker Alister Barry described Brash as "an extremist, an idealist" whose "ideal world is where the free market reigns supreme". Barry considered that Brash manipulated public opinion towards neo-liberal economics and gave as examples Brash's advocacy for abolishing the minimum wage and his Hayek Memorial Lecture to the Institute of Economic Affairs in London.

In 1990, Brash was awarded the New Zealand 1990 Commemoration Medal. In 2002, he was inducted into the New Zealand Business Hall of Fame, in recognition of his role as central bank governor.

Member of Parliament 

On 26 April 2002, shortly before the 2002 general election, Brash resigned as Reserve Bank governor to stand as a candidate for Parliament on the National Party list. The Party ranked him in fifth place on its party list – exceptional treatment for a newcomer from outside the House of Representatives. Most unusually among National candidates, he stood as a list candidate without running for an electorate seat. Though National had its worst performance ever, gaining only 21% of the party vote, Brash's high place on the party list assured him of a seat in Parliament.

Brash immediately joined National's front bench as its spokesman on finance. This placed him opposite the Labour Party's Michael Cullen, the Minister of Finance and Deputy Prime Minister. Commentators generally praised Brash for his knowledge of economics, but expressed criticism of his inexperience in terms of political leadership.

In October 2003, Brash publicly challenged Bill English for the position of Parliamentary Leader of the National Party. English had gradually lost support within the party, but Brash's victory in any leadership-contest against English seemed by no means guaranteed. Brash's decision to make his challenge public caused some criticism, with some party supporters perceiving that an open leadership dispute could damage the party's image. However, by breaking with the tradition of operating secretly, Brash calculated that people would see him as an honest "anti-politician" – a notion central to his personal brand.

Leader of the Opposition 

Brash won a caucus vote on 28 October 2003, making him Leader of the National Party Caucus (and thus Leader of the Opposition) after one year as a Member of Parliament. He remained National's finance spokesman, appointing the equally new MP John Key as his deputy finance-spokesman, and eventually appointing Key the primary finance-spokesman after a Caucus reshuffle in August 2004.

Orewa speech 

On 27 January 2004 Brash delivered his first Orewa speech on "Nationhood" at the Orewa Rotary Club, north of Auckland, expressing opposition to perceived "Māori racial separatism" in New Zealand:

The topic I will focus on today is the dangerous drift towards racial separatism in New Zealand, and the development of the now entrenched Treaty grievance industry. We are one country with many peoples, not simply a society of Pākehā and Māori where the minority has a birthright to the upper hand, as the Labour Government seems to believe".[...]

Though the sentiments expressed in the Orewa speech differed little from established National Party views (as voiced previously by Bill English, for example), these comments resulted in National receiving an unprecedented boost in a public opinion poll. National gained 17 percentage points in the February 2004 Colmar Brunton poll for Television New Zealand, taken shortly after the speech. The surge in National support marked the biggest single gain by a political party in a single poll in Colmar Brunton's polling history at that point. In the months that followed, changes of emphasis in Labour's policy agenda became apparent as Labour attempted to recoup the ground lost to National in the February poll.

Shortly after the delivery of the Orewa speech, Brash fired his Māori Affairs spokesperson Georgina te Heuheu because she would not publicly support his speech.

After the February peak, National suffered a steady decline in public opinion polls, leaving it 11 points behind Labour at the end of 2004.

In 2004, following a political speech given by the Prime Minister Helen Clark inside the Christchurch Cathedral, Brash wrote to the dean of the cathedral, Peter Beck. In his letter he criticised Clark's use of a church-venue for delivering a political speech, and he raised questions over her views on religion and on the institution of marriage. After Clark retaliated, Brash apologised for any offence that his comments had caused to her, and revealed that his chief of staff, Richard Long, had written the letter, not Brash himself.

On 25 January 2005 Brash made his third speech to the Orewa Rotary Club (his first had come in the final week of January 2003, while still National's finance spokesman). This time Brash focussed on "Welfare Dependency: Whatever Happened to Personal Responsibility?" Brash pledged to reduce the number of working-age beneficiaries from the current figure of 300,000 to 200,000 over ten years, and he dedicated a significant part of his speech to the Domestic Purposes Benefit. At the time approximately 109,000 single parents received the DPB, costing taxpayers about $1.5 billion a year. Brash noted that since the inception of the DPB in 1974, the population of New Zealand had increased by 30% while the numbers receiving the DPB had increased almost ninefold. Brash used the speech to highlight his views on both the fiscal and social costs of entrenched welfare-dependency:

How can we tolerate a welfare system which allows children to grow up in a household where the parents are permanently dependent on a welfare benefit? Our welfare system is contributing to the creation of a generation of children condemned to a lifetime of deprivation, with limited education, without life skills, and without the most precious inheritance from their parents, a sense of ambition or aspiration. Nothing can be more destructive of self esteem.

Brash proposed a number of ways to reduce welfare dependency and to refocus the DPB back to its original intent of giving aid to single-parent families in need or in danger. These proposals included enforcing child-support payments from absent fathers, requiring single parents to work or perform community services once their children reached school age, and introducing penalties for women seeking the DPB who refused to name the father of their child. He also acknowledged adoption as an acceptable option, particularly for teenage girls, and drew attention to the growth in numbers of single mothers giving birth to additional children while already receiving the single-parent DPB benefit.

Some elements of the speech put his Social Welfare spokesperson, Katherine Rich, at odds with Brash, and he fired her from the portfolio, promoting the MP for Clevedon, Judith Collins, in her place.

Views on race-relations

Māori identity 

After the Orewa speech of 2004, Brash's public statements on race relations received significant attention, both in the traditional media and online. During the 2005 election campaign, he criticised the use of powhiri in welcoming international visitors:

I mean, I think there is a place for Maori culture but why is it that we always use a semi-naked male, sometimes quite pale-skinned Māori, leaping around in, you know, mock battle?

In September 2006 Brash stated that:

There are clearly many New Zealanders who do see themselves as distinctly and distinctively Māori – but it is also clear there are few, if any, fully Māori left here. There has been a lot of intermarriage and that has been welcome.

These comments received a negative response from other political leaders, who portrayed focussing on blood quantum as divisive and as harking back to racist laws, and who suggested the appropriateness for Māori themselves to determine how to define themselves.

Brash questioned whether Māori remained a distinct indigenous group because few "full-blooded" individuals survive. This drew criticism from a range of his adversaries, including Māori Party co-leader Tariana Turia, who cancelled a dinner with him in protest. In a statement to explain his position on 30 September 2006, Brash said that the Government had no responsibility to address the over-representation of Māori in negative social statistics. "If Māori New Zealanders die more frequently from lung cancer than non-Māori do, for example, it is almost certainly because Māori New Zealanders choose to smoke more heavily than other New Zealanders do".

British heritage 
Brash stressed the significance of New Zealand's British heritage. When asked "who are the ideal immigrants?", Brash made the following statement;

British immigrants fit in here very well. My own ancestry is all British. New Zealand values are British values, derived from centuries of struggle since Magna Carta. Those things make New Zealand the society it is.

2005 general election 

In July 2005, Prime Minister Helen Clark announced that a General Election would take place on 17 September. At that time Brash and the National Party led by a slim margin in the opinion-polls. But by mid-August both Brash and National had declined in popularity. Commentators attributed this trend to a series of announcements of new spending programs by Labour, and to confusion as to whether National could form a stable coalition government with New Zealand First and/or ACT New Zealand.

The National Party advertising campaign aimed at rebutting arguments brought up by Labour about a variety of themes: Brash's stand on national security issues (he favoured greater co-operation with "traditional allies"), his commitment to social security programmes (including healthcare), as well as his ideas on the perceived drift towards "racial separatism" dividing Māori from other New Zealanders. One of Brash's most significant and widely publicised policy announcements foreshadowed the introduction of tax-cuts for working New Zealanders. Brash's party embarked on a targeted billboard-advertising programme, which later (post-election) won two advertising-industry awards.

In his first party-political election-campaign broadcast Brash mentioned a number of aspects of his life that he believed had attuned him to the political centre-ground in New Zealand:

registering as a conscientious objector at age 18
serving as the patron of Amnesty International Freedom Foundation
participating in demonstrations against the racially selected South African rugby team touring New Zealand (1981) and the New Zealand All-Blacks rugby team touring South Africa without Māori team members
his frugal approach, most famously washing his own laundry in his hotel-room basin while on taxpayer-funded overseas trips as Governor of the Reserve Bank
voting for Labour in his early years

Campaign 
On 19 August 2005, National unveiled a $3.9 billion tax-cut policy. The first polling conducted after the announcement suggested that it had boosted National support. On 22 August, Brash engaged in a televised debate with the Labour Party leader Helen Clark. According to The New Zealand Herald, Clark appeared 'confident and aggressive' and Brash appeared 'defensive'. In response to questions over his assertiveness, Brash indicated that he had not attacked Clark during the debate because she was a woman. Clark described Brash's explanation as patronising.

On 27 August a weekend newspaper published a series of leaked documents, including private emails, showing that members of the ACT party and of the Business Round Table had advised Brash during his bid for the leadership of the parliamentary National Party. Continuing leaks over following weeks appeared designed to cause the National leader embarrassment. Furthermore, confusion bedevilled National's potential coalition options: New Zealand First showed reluctance to reveal whether it would support National or Labour post-election, whilst ACT (often seen as National's natural coalition partner due to the similarities in some of their policies) criticised National for not openly supporting ACT leader Rodney Hide's bid to win the electorate seat of Epsom.

Pamphlets distributed by members of a Christian sect, the Exclusive Brethren, in early September caused further embarrassment for Brash; although they were not anonymous, they did not refer to the Exclusive Brethren but were authorised in the names of individual church members.  Brash initially denied National had anything to do with it, but later admitted that the Brethren had told him at a meeting some months earlier that they planned to run a campaign opposing the direction of the Labour Government. Brash has maintained his position that the pamphlet-campaign took place on the Exclusive Brethren's own initiative.

The General Election on 17 September produced a close result, with initial election-night figures from rural areas favouring National (in accordance with tradition and previous patterns); but by the end of the evening Labour had won 40.7% of the vote to National's 39.6%. Following the counting of the special votes the gap widened, with Labour taking 41.1% of the vote to National's 39.1%. Dr Brash conceded defeat on 1 October after weeks of electoral uncertainty while the major parties sought to secure the support of minor coalition partners. His only realistic scenario for becoming prime minister would have involved a coalition between National, ACT and United Future, with confidence and supply from New Zealand First and the Māori Party. This appeared highly unlikely on several counts. New Zealand First's involvement in such a coalition would have run counter to its pre-election promise to deal with the biggest party. Brash's promise to abolish Māori electorates alienated the Māori Party.

Essentially National had failed to make up enough ground in the cities but swept the electoral votes in the provinces, clawing back a number of seats from Labour and defeating New Zealand First founder-leader Winston Peters in his electorate (Peters remained in Parliament as a list MP). Apart from in Auckland, National's support centred mainly in rural and provincial areas.

2006–2011 
Brash took leave on 13 September 2006, to sort out marital troubles. Rumours of an extramarital affair came to the public's attention around this date after National MP Brian Connell allegedly confronted Brash in a caucus-meeting about the rumours. Details leaked to the press, and in the weeks that followed the National Party caucus suspended Connell from membership of the caucus.

On Saturday 23 September, Brash appeared on Television New Zealand's Agenda news program and acknowledged that he had met with Exclusive Brethren representatives after the 2005 general election.

Brash indicated his intention to remain the leader of the National Party and to contest the next election in that role. However, it became increasingly clear that the caucus preferred Finance Spokesman John Key, whose rating steadily rose in "preferred Prime Minister" polls. Key made no move publicly, but Brash's reputation for honesty and political competence eroded when, for example, broadcast footage showed him walking a plank, and when allegations appeared of his having an affair with an Auckland businesswoman, Diane Foreman – a charge he has never denied. Despite these setbacks, when asked by an interviewer for an article published in the United Kingdom on 18 November 2006 if he planned to remain leader of his party, "...the Clark Kent of Kiwi politics [Brash] turned to me and smiled gently. 'That's my intention,'..."

Resignation 

During a hastily called press-conference on Thursday 23 November 2006, Brash announced his resignation as the National Party leader, effective from 27 November. Speculation regarding his leadership had foreshadowed this move, and the publicity had had a negative effect on his political party. The publicity came to a head just before the scheduled publication of a book written by Nicky Hager containing leaked emails (amongst other allegedly damaging revelations).

On 16 November 2006 Brash had obtained a High Court injunction prohibiting the distribution or publication of the private emails allegedly unlawfully taken from his computer, following ongoing rumours that his opponents would publish a series of his personal emails as a book, and he confirmed that the police had commenced a criminal investigation into the alleged email-theft. However he claimed he had no awareness of and did not wish to stop the publication of the Hager book.
As part of his resignation announcement, Brash also announced he had cleared the way for the book's release by providing copies of his emails to Hager, and stated it had nothing to with his resignation.

Brash also claimed that the publication of the book did not contribute to his decision to resign as National Party leader. The book, The Hollow Men: A Study in the Politics of Deception, details Brash's rise to power in the National Party as assisted by an "informal network of people from the right of New Zealand politics", including a number of ACT members. It also documents that senior National Party figures, including Brash, knew of the Exclusive Brethren's pamphlet campaigns in May 2005, although Brash denied knowledge of this until August.

On Thursday 30 November 2006, just one week after resigning as leader of the party, Brash resigned from Parliament after the National Party's new parliamentary leader, John Key, declined to offer him a senior portfolio. He set no official date, but he stated he would not return in the new year.

Brash then made his valedictory speech on Tuesday 12 December 2006. On 7 February 2007, Katrina Shanks took his place as a National Party list MP.

Career after national politics 
On 18 May 2007, Brash joined the ANZ National Bank board as Rob McLeod retired from the board to return to his accounting practice. He also chairs Huljich Wealth Management, an independent, specialist funds-management company based in Auckland, New Zealand. In late 2008 he was lecturing in economics at the Auckland University of Technology In April 2009 Brash was appointed as a director of the electricity grid operator Transpower.

In late April 2011, Brash, still a National Party member, announced that he would like to lead the ACT Party, which would require incumbent leader Rodney Hide to step down. Hide dismissed any talk of a leadership challenge to him but Brash was quoted as saying, "I'd like to say to the board that, under my leadership, I believe Act has a much better prospect of not only getting back into Parliament but having a significant number of MPs." John Key also would not rule out working with Brash if it came down to a tight decision.

Brash chairs the New Zealand branch of the state-owned Industrial and Commercial Bank of China.

Leadership of the ACT Party 
On 28 April 2011 the incumbent leader of the ACT Party, Rodney Hide, announced that he was stepping down as leader in favour of Brash who had joined the party that morning. His membership was ratified by the party board on Saturday 30 April and the ACT party parliamentary caucus confirmed him as leader the same day. The party board re-convened later that day to ratify his leadership. Rodney Hide remained in Parliament until its dissolution prior to the 2011 general election. Brash was leader of the party outside Parliament and former Auckland City mayor John Banks stood in Epsom. The Listener compared Brash's successful bid for the leadership of the ACT Party to a hostile takeover. Brash hoped to get ACT 15% of the party vote in the 2011 election, but it only managed 1%. Brash resigned on election night and was later replaced as leader by John Banks.

Brash's 213 day tenure as ACT leader remained the shortest tenure of any major party leader in modern New Zealand politics until 14 July 2020, when National Party Leader Todd Muller resigned from the position just 53 days after he was elected to the position.

Hobson's Pledge 
In September 2016, Brash became the spokesperson for a new lobby group called Hobson's Pledge. Hobson's Pledge is named after William Hobson, the first Governor of New Zealand and co-author of the Treaty of Waitangi. The group was formed to oppose what Brash has described as Māori favouritism and advocates abolishing the Māori electorates.

2018 Massey University talk and free speech 
On 7 August 2018, Massey University Vice-Chancellor Jan Thomas cancelled Brash's talk scheduled for the next day at the university's Palmerston North campus. She cited safety issues regarding Brash's support for the alt-right Canadian activists Lauren Southern and Stefan Molyneux's Auckland tour and his leadership of the Hobson's Pledge advocacy group, which has advocated the abolition of the Māori wards. She said too she "supported free speech on campus, but totally opposed hate speech".

Brash criticised her decision as a threat to free speech. The cancellation was criticised by various public figures including Prime Minister Jacinda Ardern, Education Minister Chris Hipkins, Opposition Leader Simon Bridges, and Massey University Students' Association President Ben Schmidt, and ACT party leader David Seymour. In addition, several Māori Members of Parliament including Green Party co-leader Marama Davidson and Labour MP Willie Jackson defended Brash's right to free speech while expressing disagreement with his views of Māori. Brash later received a second invitation and delivered a speech on the campus on 17 October 2018, where fewer than 100 students were reported to attend.

COVID-19 pandemic
During the COVID-19 pandemic in New Zealand, Brash joined several businessmen and former politicians including former National MP Ross Meurant in establishing a company called Covax-NZR Limited to import Russia's untested Gam-COVID-Vac (also known as Sputnik V) vaccine into New Zealand. By late August 2020, they had submitted paperwork through the Russian Embassy to establish supply and distribution arrangements to import the vaccine, however no further progress has been made since then.

Political positions 
Brash voted for the decriminalisation of both prostitution and euthanasia, voted against raising the drinking age back up to 20 and voted against Manukau banning street prostitution. Brash voted against the Civil Unions Bill because he backed a public mandate for any change to the law. He has also called for the decriminalisation of cannabis.

In March 2013, Brash joined the debate over the future of Auckland, saying land needed to be freed up for residential zoning so house prices would come down, at odds with Mayor Len Brown's plan to stop urban sprawl and build the city upwards.

Biography 
 Paul Goldsmith: Brash: A Biography: Auckland: Penguin: 2005: 
 Nicky Hager: The Hollow Men: A Study in the Politics of Deception: Nelson: Craig Potton: 2006:

Partial list of publications 

"An investigation into the growth of New Zealand's external indebtedness, on public and private account, in the period since 1949/50, and a parallel study of changes in her debt servicing capacity", University of Canterbury thesis (1962)
"United States investment in Australian manufacturing industry", Australian National University thesis (1965)

Notes

References

External links 

 2004 Orewa speech
 2005 Orewa speech
 Independent Review of Monetary Policy
 ABC Late Night Live interview with Nicky Hager
 The Hollow Men documentary about Don Brash and the National Party in the 2005 election made in conjunction with Nicky Hager's book

Political offices 

1940 births
20th-century New Zealand politicians
21st-century New Zealand politicians
Academic staff of the Auckland University of Technology
Australian National University alumni
Governors of the Reserve Bank of New Zealand
ACT New Zealand leaders
Leaders of the Opposition (New Zealand)
Living people
Members of the New Zealand House of Representatives
New Zealand conscientious objectors
20th-century New Zealand economists
New Zealand list MPs
New Zealand National Party leaders
New Zealand National Party MPs
New Zealand officials of the United Nations
New Zealand people of Scottish descent
People educated at Christchurch Boys' High School
People from Whanganui
University of Canterbury alumni
Unsuccessful candidates in the 1981 New Zealand general election
Unsuccessful candidates in the 2011 New Zealand general election
World Bank people